Nicole Gibbs and Vania King were the defending champions, but both players chose not to participate.

Michaëlla Krajicek and Taylor Townsend won the title after Mihaela Buzărnescu and Renata Zarazúa withdrew from the final.

Seeds

Draw

References 
 Draw

Waco Showdown - Doubles